"London" is a poem by William Blake, published in Songs of Experience in 1794. It is one of the few poems in Songs of Experience that does not have a corresponding poem in Songs of Innocence. Blake lived in London so writes of it as a resident rather than a visitor. The poems reference the "Two Contrary States of the Human Soul". The "Songs of Innocence" section contains poems which reference love, childhood and nature. Critics have suggested that the poems illustrate the effects of modernity on people and nature, through the discussion of dangerous industrial conditions, child labour, prostitution and poverty.

Poem
I wander thro’ each charter’d street,
Near where the charter’d Thames does flow.
And mark in every face I meet
Marks of weakness, marks of woe.

In every cry of every Man,
In every Infants cry of fear,
In every voice: in every ban,
The mind-forg’d manacles I hear

How the Chimney-sweepers cry
Every blackning Church appalls,
And the hapless Soldiers sigh
Runs in blood down Palace walls

But most thro’ midnight streets I hear
How the youthful Harlots curse
Blasts the new-born Infants tear
And blights with plagues the Marriage hearse

Analysis of the poem

This poem is taken from “songs of experience”. It reveals the poet's feelings towards the society in which he lived. England in the 1800s became very oppressive, influenced by fears over the French Revolution. Laws began to be imposed which restricted the freedom of individuals. At first, Blake loved London, writing about “golden London and her silver Thames, throng’d with shining spires and corded ships”(Poetical Sketches), but after the French Revolution, the British government began to oppress the civil democratic activities, making London quite different from before: "everything was covered with darkness, terrors and miseries.” (Zhan,2013). Thus he shows a negative picture of London, and offers social criticism of early 19th-century England. An acrostic can be found in the third stanza. The word "Hear" is spelled out in the first letters of each line.  This acrostic is foreshadowed in the last word of the second stanza.

Themes
 Lack of freedom
 Sources for the lack of freedom
 Downfall of London.

Literary techniques
 Polyptoton - "mark in every face I meet, // Marks of weakness, marks of woe.
 Structure – four quatrains with alternate lines rhyming. ABABCDCD
 Alliteration – “weakness, marks of woe”
 Oxymoron – Marriage hearse
 Repetition:
 “chartered” – shows the inability to escape and reflects the suffocating atmosphere of the London city.
 “cry” – shows the suffering of both adults and children in London.

Publishing
Songs of Innocence and Experience was  originally hand-printed and illustrated by Blake in 1794. Punctuation: as can be seen in the image, there are capital letters, commas, and full stops (periods).  Using these as a guide, the poem read as transcribed above when first attached to the image by Blake.  The text appears with some alterations and/or additions to its punctuation in later iterations—19th through 21st-century anthologies, reviews, etc.  Was Blake ever the individual making such changes, or was it always later editors and publishers?

Allusions
Blake suggests that the experience of living there could encourage a revolution on the streets of the capital. This could have been influenced by the recent French Revolution. The use of the word "chartered" is ambiguous and goes against control and ownership. It may express the political and economic control that Blake considered London to be enduring at the time of his writing. Blake's friend Thomas Paine had criticised the granting of Royal Charters to control trade as a form of class oppression. However, "chartered" could also mean "freighted" and may refer to the busy or overburdened streets and river or to the licensed trade carried on within them.  In the original draft, the word used was simply "dirty" ("I wander through each dirty street / Near where the dirty Thames does flow"). Blake makes reference to the "Blackening church" suggesting that the church as an institution is not only physically blackening from the soot of London, but is actually rotting from the inside, insinuating severe corruption. Blake created the idea of the poem from using a semantic field of unhappiness. This is presented through the verbs 'curse', 'cry' and 'sigh'.

Adaptations
Ralph Vaughan Williams set the poem to music in his 1958 song cycle Ten Blake Songs.

The poem was set to music in 1965 by Benjamin Britten as part of his song cycle Songs and Proverbs of William Blake.

The poem was set to music in 1987 by Tangerine Dream on their album Tyger; the album is based on the poems of William Blake.

"London" also inspired the opening lines of The Verve's 1995 single "History".

Sparklehorse adapted the poem into music in a single, which was also named after it.

References

External links

A Comparison of the original hand-painted copies of "London" available from the William Blake Archive
 William Blake's London by Lethargica. The Internet Archive. Retrieved 07/05/2008.
 The Poem 'London' main theme of the 'London' by William Blake.

1794 poems
Songs of Innocence and of Experience
Works about London
Poems about cities
Culture associated with the River Thames